Telephone numbers in Mauritius follow a closed numbering plan and are regulated by the Information and Communication Technologies Authority.

Numbering details
Mauritian phone numbers are seven (landline) to eight digits (mobile) long. Landline numbers begin with 2 (north), 4 (central), or 6 (south). Mobile numbers begin with the digit 5.

Calling formats
To call a Mauritius mobile phone, the following format is used:
 5 123 4567       Calls inside Mauritius
 +230 5 123 4567  Calls from outside Mauritius

To call a Mauritius fixed line, the following format is used:
 123 4567       Calls inside Mauritius
 +230 123 4567  Calls from outside Mauritius

References

External links
Information and Communications Technologies Authority (ICTA – Telecommunications regulator for Mauritius

Mauritius
Telecommunications in Mauritius
Telephone numbers